Rajabala is one of the 60 Legislative Assembly constituencies of Meghalaya state in India.

It is part of West Garo Hills district.

Members of the Legislative Assembly

Election results

2021 by-election 
The by-election was needed due to the death of sitting MLA, Azad Zaman. The polling took place on 30 October 2021 and the votes were counted on 2 November.

2018

See also
 List of constituencies of the Meghalaya Legislative Assembly
 West Garo Hills district

References

West Garo Hills district
Assembly constituencies of Meghalaya